At the 1986 Commonwealth Games, the athletics events were held at the Meadowbank Stadium in Edinburgh, Scotland. A total of 41 events were contested, of which 23 by male and 18 by female athletes.

The majority of African, Asian and Caribbean countries boycotted the event due to the United Kingdom's sporting links with apartheid-era South Africa. As a result, the medallists came from only seven nations, comprising the four constituent countries of the UK, Australia, New Zealand and Canada. England easily topped the medal table with eighteen gold medals and 48 medals in total. Canada was second, with ten golds and 28 medals overall, while Australia took third place with nine golds and a total of 26 medals. The hosts Scotland won one gold and six medals while Northern Ireland (typically weak in the sport) had one of their best games, with one gold and four medals overall.

Medal summary

Men

Women

Medal table

Participation

References
Commonwealth Games Medallists - Men. GBR Athletics. Retrieved on 2010-07-21.
Commonwealth Games Medallists - Women. GBR Athletics. Retrieved on 2010-07-21.

 
1986 Commonwealth Games events
1986
Commonwealth Games
1986 Commonwealth Games